Ochlockonee Bay is an unincorporated community in Wakulla County, Florida, United States, located at the intersection of U.S. Highway 98 and County Road 372, south of Panacea. Situated on the north shore of Ochlockonee Bay, it is also recognized by the U.S. Postal Service as Ochlockonee.

Unincorporated communities in Wakulla County, Florida
Unincorporated communities in Florida